This is a list of people, who have been heads of government of the Republic of Estonia from 1918, either as a Chairman of the Council of Elders (1918), Prime Minister (1918–1920; 1934–1940 and from 1990), State Elder (1920–1934) or President-Regent (1937–1938).  The office of Prime Minister (Peaminister) first came into use soon after Estonia gained its independence in 1918.  From 1918 to 1934, Estonia used a parliamentary political system, where the presidency and ministry were subject to parliamentary confidence, but instead of a presidential office, the government was headed by a Prime Minister and from 1920 to 1934, a similar office called State Elder (Riigivanem).

The 1934 constitution gave the State Elder the role of the president, with a separate head of government created, restoring the office of Prime Minister. The new system was obstructed by a 1934 coup d'état by head of government Konstantin Päts. During his authoritarian era (1934–1937), he ruled as both Prime Minister and State Elder.  The latter office was entrusted to him briefly until the presidential elections. In 1937, the two offices were combined into the office of President-Regent (Riigihoidja), but the situation was again changed with the 1938 constitution, when Konstantin Päts gave up the office of Prime Minister to a new officeholder.

The Soviet occupation of Estonia in 1940 made Johannes Vares the new Prime Minister of Estonia, but his rule was later declared to have been illegal.  According to the 1938 constitution, Prime Minister was to lead the presidency in case the President couldn't be elected, a move that was implemented for the Estonian Government in Exile. The interim government restored the office of Prime Minister in 1990.

List of heads of government

Statistics

Time in office
A total of 23 people have headed the Government of Estonia, 13 before and 10 after the Soviet occupation. Konstantin Päts headed the government for the longest, a total of 3,563 days during six different terms (2,059 days without his authoritarian era). Andrus Ansip is the second longest office holder with 3,271 days, having been democratically in office longer than Päts.

The shortest time in office was for Ado Birk, when he served as Prime Minister for only 3 days and never actually stepping into office. Acting Prime Minister Otto Tief was in office for 8 days between the German and Soviet occupations in 1944. Ants Piip, August Rei, Jüri Uluots, Juhan Kukk, Friedrich Karl Akel and Jüri Jaakson were also in office for less than a year.

Number and length of terms
Konstantin Päts served a total of six terms, although his sixth term turned into an authoritarian regime. Jaan Tõnisson was in office four times, although there was just one full day of Ado Birk's cabinet between his first two terms. Otto August Strandman, Jaan Teemant, Karl August Einbund (named Kaarel Eenpalu during his second term in the semi-authoritarian era), Tiit Vähi (first term during the interim period) and Mart Laar all served two terms in office.

Longest average term lengths are all in the reindependence period with Andrus Ansip in the lead (3,271 days), Jüri Ratas second (1,525 days) and Mart Laar third (895 days). Longest interwar average term is held by Konstantin Päts (594 days). During the interwar democratic era however, longest average term was achieved by Jaan Teemant (439 days), followed by Otto August Strandman (389 days) and by Konstantin Päts himself (383 days).

The era before occupation had the shortest average term lengths with the two extremes of Ado Birk (3 days) and Otto Tief (8 days), but also Ants Piip with 92 days. Jaan Tõnisson also had an average term length of only 216 days. Andres Tarand (with 161 days) and Siim Kallas (with 438 days) have the shortest average term lengths during the reindependence era.

Age at assuming office
Mart Laar was only 32 years old when he became Prime Minister in 1992. Ado Birk, Ants Piip, Juhan Kukk, Taavi Rõivas, Edgar Savisaar, Mart Laar (2nd term in 1999) and Juhan Parts were also in their 30s when appointed. Jaan Tõnisson was 64 when stepping into office in 1933. The rest were in their 40s or 50s when assuming office, average age at appointment is 48.

Notes

List of heads of government